This is a list of archives in Australia.

Archives in Australia

National
 Archives of the Australian Museum
 National Archives of Australia
 National Film and Sound Archive
 Australian Lesbian and Gay Archives
 Australian Archives of the Dance
 Australian Data Archive
 Australian Trade Union Archives
 National Gallery of Australia Research Library
 National Library of Australia

State
 Archives Office of Tasmania
 J.S. Battye Library of West Australian History
 Northern Territory Archives Service
 Public Record Office Victoria
 State Library of Tasmania
 State Library of Victoria
 Archive Services Centre of Victoria Police - 135,000 boxes, part of over 500,000 items over more than 200 sites that they are responsible for.
 Queensland State Archives
 State Records Authority of New South Wales
 State Records of South Australia
 State Records Office of Western Australia

Capital City
 City of Sydney Archives
 Adelaide City Archives

Regional City / Town
 Geelong Heritage Centre

University
 Australian National University Archives
 University of Canberra Lu Rees Archives
 University of Melbourne
 University of New South Wales

Other
 ACT Heritage Library
 Noel Butlin Archives
 Pandora Archive
 Archive of Australian Judaica

See also 

 List of archives
 List of museums in Australia
 Culture of Australia

References

External links 

 
Archives
Australia
Archives